Chandless may refer to:

People with the surname
 John Chandless (1884–1968), Welsh cricketer
 William Chandless, British explorer

Other uses
 Chandless River, in Western Brazil